Abdullah Al-Sobeai (born 19 December 1993) is a Saudi Arabian footballer who plays for Al-Zulfi as a midfielder.

References

External links
 

Living people
1993 births
People from Dammam
Association football midfielders
Saudi Arabian footballers
Ettifaq FC players
Al-Shabab FC (Riyadh) players
Damac FC players
Al-Raed FC players
Khaleej FC players
Al-Nojoom FC players
Al Safa FC players
Al-Nahda Club (Saudi Arabia) players
Al-Zulfi FC players
Place of birth missing (living people)
Saudi Professional League players
Saudi First Division League players
Saudi Second Division players